Maurice A. West II is a Democratic member of the Illinois House of Representatives for the 67th district. West took office on January 9, 2019. The 67th district includes portions of the City of Rockford.

West won a four-person primary against Angela Fellars, Valeri DeCastris, and Gerald Albert. Prior to his election to the Illinois House of Representatives, West ran for Rockford City Council in 2013 and the Rock Valley College board of trustees in 2015.

West was a member of the Community Action Agency Board since his appointment by then-mayor Larry Morrissey. He was the director of career development at Rockford University. West has a Bachelor of Science in psychology and sociology from Illinois College and a Master of Arts in industrial and organizational psychology from The Chicago School of Professional Psychology.

As of July 3, 2022, Representative West is a member of the following Illinois House committees:

 Criminal Administration and Enforcement Committee (HJUC-CAES)
 Firearms and Firearm Safety Subcommittee (HJUC-FIRE)
 Higher Education Committee (HHED)
 Judiciary - Criminal Committee (HJUC)
 Juvenile Justice and System-Involved Youth Subcommittee (HJUC-JJSI)
 Mental Health & Addiction Committee (HMEH)
 Property Tax Subcommittee (HREF-PRTX)
 Public Utilities Committee (HPUB)
 Restorative Justice Committee (SHRJ)
 Revenue & Finance Committee (HREF)
 Sentencing, Penalties, and Criminal Procedure Subcommittee (HJUC-SPCP)
 Sex Offenses and Sex Offender Registration Subcommittee (HJUC-SOSO)
 Special Issues Subcommittee (HMEH-ISSU)
 Utilities Subcommittee (HPUB-UTIL)

Electoral history

References

External links
 Campaign website

21st-century American politicians
African-American state legislators in Illinois
Illinois College alumni
Democratic Party members of the Illinois House of Representatives
Politicians from Rockford, Illinois
Rockford University faculty
Living people
1985 births
21st-century African-American politicians
20th-century African-American people